Federico Román (or: General Federico Román) is one of the five provinces of the Bolivian department of Pando and is situated in the department's northeastern parts. Its name honours General Federico Román.

Location 
Federico Román province is located between 09° 41' and 10° 51' South and between 65° 17' and 66° 39' West. It extends over 150 km from North to South, and 200 km from West to East.

The province is situated in the Amazon lowlands of Bolivia and borders Abuná Province in the West, Manuripi Province in the Southwest, Beni Department in the Southeast, and Brazil in the East and North.

The border to Beni Department in the South forms Río Beni, to neighbouring Brazil Río Madeira in the East and Río Abuná in the North.

Population 
The population of Federico Román Province has increased by more than 400% over the recent two decades:
1992: 1,516 inhabitants (census)
2001: 2,242 inhabitants (census)
2012: 7,034 inhabitants (census)
 
39.6% of the population are younger than 15 years old. (1992)

87.9% of the population speak Spanish, 3.1% speak Quechua, 1.2% Aymara, and 26.5 speak foreign languages (mainly  Portuguese, due to the nearness to Brazil) . (1992)

The literacy rate of the province's population is 72.6%. (1992)

83.1% of the population have no access to electricity, 59.1% have no sanitary facilities. (1992)

83.1% of the population are Catholics, 15.2% are Protestants. (1992)

Division 
The province comprises three municipios:
 09-0501 Nueva Esperanza Municipality - 2,068 inhabitants (census 2012)
 09-0502 Villa Nueva Municipality - 3,275 inhabitants
 09-0503 Santos Mercado Municipality - 1,691 inhabitants

References

External links 
General map of province
Detailed map of province towns and rivers
Population data (Spanish)
Social data (Spanish)

Provinces of Pando Department